Telling Tales may refer to:

 Telling Tales (anthology), 2004 anthology
 Telling Tales (album), 2009 album by Leddra Chapman
 Telling Tales (film), 2015 Turkish film